Gegham Aleksanyan (born 1962) is an Armenian-born artist working in the United States since 2004.

Biography 
Gegham received his artistic training under Armen Atayan, a former student of Martiros Saryan and Alexander Osmerkin. Gegham received his Master of Arts degree from Yerevan State Academy of Fine Arts in 1984 and is a member of the Artists Trade Union of the Russian Federation. 

Gegham had his first solo exhibition in the United States in West Hollywood, in 2005. The subject of numerous publications, Gegham has been recognized in the United States by various art publications, including as a Top 50 Artist by Art Business News in "Counting Down the Artists of Tomorrow Whose Names You Need to Know Today". Several of his paintings have also shown digitally at Times Square as part of Art Takes Times Square 2012. In 2011, Artexpo New York recognized Gegham's The Last Light (2000) as Artwork of the Day on March 16. Gegham has also been the subject of numerous publications in his native country of Armenia prior to moving to the United States.

Gegham's oeuvre merges traditional and modern techniques and subjects in a seamless manner across various media and with a fresh perspective.
 In recent years, Gegham has continued to actively participate in juried exhibitions across the U.S., including at "Ingenuity", a juried sculpture and fine crafts exhibition at Marin Society of Artists, held in association with Pacific Rim Sculptors, a chapter of International Sculpture Centre.  Gegham also participated in "Art Takes SoHo" and exhibited at Main Street Arts gallery in Clifton Springs, New York.

In 2019, The ArtScope exclusively showcased Gegham's art at Art San Diego 2019, and Gegham participated in a group exhibition in Hawai'i, sponsored by the Hawai'i Island Art Alliance.

References 

Armenian painters
Living people
1962 births
Armenian emigrants to the United States